Grafton High School is a high school in Grafton, Massachusetts, United States.  It has a population of 875 students in grades 9–12, with an average class size of 21.

The curriculum offers a wide variety of courses in areas of business and computer science, music, video game design, English, family consumer science, health, physical education, mathematics, science and technology, social studies, special education, visual and performing arts, world languages, community service, school service, and independent studies.

History
Although Grafton operated a high school as early as 1838, the first purpose-built building was constructed in 1850, and served as the town’s high school for over 100 years.  In 1952, the “Grafton Junior-Senior High School” opened on a large parcel of land along Lake Ripple. The school moved to a new building on the same parcel in 1963 and, in 2012, to its current building. The 1963 high school now serves as the Grafton Middle School housing grades 7 and 8, and the 1952 building serves as the town’s municipal offices and senior center.

Athletics
Grafton High School is home to the Grafton Gators. The school hosts many sports teams including soccer, football, track and field, lacrosse, basketball, ice hockey, baseball, cheerleading, tennis, golf, cross country and softball. The school is part of the Southern Worcester County Athletic League. The ice hockey and softball teams recently won the State Championship in 2017.

Notable alumni

Obi Melifonwu, NFL safety, currently on the practice squad  for the New England Patriots
Ifeatu Melifonwu, an American football cornerback. He played college football at Syracuse
Ricky Duran, contestant on season 17 of The Voice on NBC
Steve Spagnuolo, defensive coordinator for the Kansas City Chiefs of the National Football League
Robert Scott Wilson, actor recognized for his work on All My Children and Days of Our Lives

References

External links 
Official Website
Grafton Public Schools Website
Grafton High School Facebook Page

Schools in Worcester County, Massachusetts
Public high schools in Massachusetts
1993 establishments in Massachusetts
Educational institutions established in 1993